

See also

 Dawn of Humanity (2015 PBS film)

References

 
2010s in paleontology
2015 in science
Bryozoology